The 2010 Pacific-10 Conference football season began on September 2, 2010 with a victory by USC at Hawaii. Conference play began on September 11 with Stanford shutting out UCLA 35–0 in Pasadena on ESPN.

Oregon repeated as the conference champion, ending the regular season with a program-first twelve wins and with a #2 BCS ranking. The Ducks earned a berth in the 2011 BCS National Championship Game, which they lost to SEC Champion Auburn. Stanford repeated as the conference runner-up, ending the regular season with a program-first eleven wins (their sole loss was to Oregon) and with a #4 BCS ranking, giving them an at-large BCS berth. The Cardinal defeated ACC Champion Virginia Tech in the 2011 Orange Bowl. Arizona lost to Oklahoma State while Washington defeated Nebraska in non-BCS bowls.

This was the final season for the conference as a 10-team league. In July 2011, Colorado and Utah joined the conference, at which time the league's name changed to the Pac-12 Conference.
The Sagarin Ratings by the end of the bowl season, ranked the Pac-10 as the best conference in football, overall.

Previous season 
During the 2009 NCAA Division I FBS football season, the Pac-10 teams won 2 and lost 5 bowl games:

 Las Vegas Bowl – BYU 44, Oregon State 20
 Poinsettia Bowl – Utah 37, California 27
 Emerald Bowl – USC 24, Boston College 13
 EagleBank Bowl – UCLA 30, Temple 21
 Holiday Bowl – Nebraska 33, Arizona 0
 Sun Bowl – Oklahoma 31, Stanford 27
 Rose Bowl – Ohio State 26, Oregon 17

Preseason 

 March 12, 2010 – Coach Chip Kelly suspended quarterback Jeremiah Masoli for the 2010 season after he pleaded guilty to second-degree burglary charges.
 March 19, 2010 – Oregon athletic director Mike Bellotti steps down to join ESPN as a football analyst.
 June 9, 2010 – Oregon dismisses Masoli.
 June 10, 2010 – The NCAA releases the report of its investigation of the USC football team for violations dealing with former Trojans running back Reggie Bush. Sanctions imposed include loss of scholarships and include a two-year postseason ban
 June 10, 2010 – Colorado joins the Pac-10 as its 11th member effective July 1, 2012. (The school and its then-current conference, the Big 12, later reached an agreement in September 2010 to allow the Buffaloes to join the Pac-10 in 2011.)
 June 17, 2010 – Utah joins the Pac-10 as its 12th member effective July 1, 2011. Although they are the 12th member to accept an invitation to the conference, they are at the time believed to be the 11th member to compete since Colorado is not initially scheduled to join until 2012.
 July 1, 2010 – Running backs coach Todd McNair's contract at USC expired June 30, 2010. He played a key part in the NCAA's investigation of the school's athletic department in dealing with Reggie Bush.
 July 6, 2010 – Seantrel Henderson, the nation's No. 1-ranked offensive tackle recruit was given a release from his commitment to play with USC. Defensive end Malik Jackson transferred to Tennessee.
 July 29, 2010 – Annual media poll: 1. Oregon (314 points); 2. USC (311); 3. Oregon State (262); 4. Stanford (233); 5. Arizona (222); 6. Washington (209); 7. California (175); 8. UCLA (134); 9. Arizona State (81); 10. Washington State (39). Media day was held at the Rose Bowl.

Rankings

Highlights

September 

 September 11 – In the first conference game of the season, #25 Stanford defeated UCLA in a 35–0 shut out at the Rose Bowl, marking several firsts: the Cardinal's first victory in Pasadena since 1996, the first home shut out UCLA had suffered since an October 16, 1999, 17–0 loss to California, the first time Stanford had shut out an opponent on the road since 1974, and the first time since 1941 that Stanford shut out UCLA.
 September 17 – In a matchup between the number one defense in the nation in Cal and the number one offense in the nation in Nevada, the Bears fell to the Wolf Pack 52–31 in Reno in the teams' first meeting since 1915.
 September 18 – Oregon records two shutouts in a season for the first time since 1964 with a 69–0 blowout of Portland State and a 72–0 shut out of New Mexico in its September 4 season opener. Two Pac-10 teams upset their opponents: UCLA defeated No. 23 Houston in the Rose Bowl for the Bruins' first win against a ranked opponent since 2008 and Arizona defeated No. 10 Iowa at home, scoring the most points allowed so far by the Hawkeyes in the season.
 September 19 – Five Pac-10 teams are ranked in the Top 25 (#5 Oregon, #14 Arizona, #16 Stanford, #20 USC, #24 Oregon State).
 September 21 – Colorado and the Big 12 Conference reach an agreement that will allow the Buffaloes to join the Pac-10 in 2011.
 September 25 – UCLA pulls off its second upset in a row of a ranked opponent with a 34–12 defeat of No. 7 Texas in front of a stadium-record crowd of 101,437 in Austin. Stanford wins at Notre Dame for the first time since 1992. No. 14 Arizona survives a scare in Tucson with a late touchdown and interception against Cal to hold on and prevent an upset in both teams' Pac-10 openers. Four Pac-10 teams (#4 Oregon, #9 Stanford, #14 Arizona, #18 USC) are 4–0.

October 
 October 2 – #9 Stanford visited #4 Oregon in a game that could decide the Pac-10 championship in their first meeting as ranked teams. The Ducks rallied to come from behind 21–3 and defeat the Cardinal. Washington upset #18 USC for two consecutive years, winning at the Los Angeles Memorial Coliseum 32–31 with a last-second field goal.
 October 9 – #3 Oregon remains the sole undefeated Pac-10 team at 6–0 with a victory over Washington State. Oregon State upsets #9 Arizona 29–27 in Tucson. Cal snaps a 3-game winning streak by UCLA with a 35–7 rout in Berkeley. #16 Stanford defeats USC 37–35 for the Trojans' second loss in a row on a last-second field goal.
 October 16 – USC quarterback Matt Barkley throws a school record-tying five touchdowns in a 48–14 blowout victory over Cal. Cal has won three games (all at home) by the margin of 139–17 and lost three games (all on the road) 110–54. Washington upsets #24 Oregon State in 35–34 in double overtime, snapping a six-game losing streak to the Beavers. Both teams were tied at 21 points apiece at the end of regulation.
 October 17 – Oregon earns a #1 ranking in the AP and Coaches' Polls and a #2 BCS ranking.
 October 21 – Oregon quarterback Darron Thomas throws for a career-high 308 yards in a 60–13 blowout of UCLA.
 October 23 – Stanford gets their sixth victory in seven games to open a season for the first time since 1970 with a victory over Washington State, becoming bowl-eligible for the second straight season since 1995–96. Cal defeats Arizona State 50–17, while #15 Arizona routs Washington 44–14.

 October 30 – Arizona State shuts out Washington State 42–0 and Washington is shut out at home for the first time since 1976 by No. 13 Stanford 41–0. No. 15 Arizona holds off UCLA to prevail 29–21, while Oregon State defeats Cal for the fourth time in a row, 35–7. Oregon running back LaMichael James sets a school record with his 15th career 100-yard rushing game and Darron Thomas becomes the first quarterback to throw 20 touchdown passes in a season since 2007 as #1 Oregon stays unbeaten with a 53–32 defeat of #24 USC.

 October 31 – Oregon is ranked first in the BCS, AP, and Coaches Polls.

November 
 November 6 – Top-ranked Oregon fails to score in the first quarter for the first time in the season in a 53–16 rout of Washington. #10 Stanford dominates #13 Arizona in a 42–17 victory. USC edges out Arizona State 34–33 after a last minute Sun Devils field goal misses. UCLA defeats Oregon State 17–14 on a field goal with 1 second left in regulation. Cal holds off Washington State for its first road victory since the 2009 Big Game against Stanford.
 November 13 – Oregon is held scoreless in the first quarter for the second week in a row and held to a season-low 317 yards of offense, but holds off Cal for a 15–13 victory, the first game of the season where the Ducks did not score at least 42 points and win by at least 11 points. #7 Stanford edges out Arizona State 17–13. USC upsets #18 Arizona 24–21. Washington State snaps a 16-game conference losing streak by defeating Oregon State 31–14 in Corvallis.
 November 14 – Oregon holds its #1 rankings in all polls. Stanford holds its #7 ranking in the AP Poll and its #8 ranking in the Harris Polls while rising from #9 to #8 in the Coaches Poll. Arizona falls to #23 in all polls. USC returns to the AP rankings at #20. Three Pac-10 teams are bowl assured: Oregon, Stanford, and Arizona.
 November 18 – In its home finale, Washington has two 100-yard rushers for the first time since 2007 and puts up a season-high 253 yards rushing in a 24–7 defeat of UCLA.
 November 20 – #7 Stanford ties a 1975 Cal record for the most points in Big Game history to recapture the Stanford Axe from Cal in Berkeley, 48–14. Oregon State upsets #20 USC at Corvallis 36–7, the third consecutive victory for the Beavers over the Trojans in Oregon. They will have faced five Top 10 teams by the end of the year.
 November 26 – Arizona State tops UCLA 55–34. Wildcats quarterback Nick Foles passes for a career-high 448 yards, but his performance is not enough to stage an upset of #1 Oregon by #20 Arizona, as the Ducks prevail 48–29.
 November 27 – Washington keeps its bowl hopes alive by scoring a touchdown with 2 seconds left in the game in a matchup against Cal to prevail 16–13, ending Cal's bowl hopes. #6 Stanford has its first 11-game winning season in school history with a 38–0 shutout of Oregon State, its third conference shutout of the season. Notre Dame defeats USC 20–16 for its first win since 2001. Oregon moves down in the BCS rankings to #2, while Stanford moves up to #4.

December 
 December 2 – Arizona State blocks two PATs to defeat Arizona in double overtime 30–29 in their annual Territorial Cup game.
 December 3 – The NCAA denies Arizona State's request for a waiver to play in a post-season bowl game.
 December 4 – Oregon repeats as the conference champion with a victory over Oregon State in the Civil War to finish with 12 wins for the first time in program history. USC defeats UCLA for the fourth straight time to hold on to the Victory Bell. Washington defeats Washington State in the Apple Cup on a game-winning touchdown with 44 seconds left in the game to become bowl-eligible for the first time since 2001.
 December 5 – Auburn moves past Oregon for the #1 AP Ranking. The two teams will meet in the BCS National Championship Game. #5 Stanford won an at-large BCS berth and will face ACC Champion Virginia Tech in the Orange Bowl, Arizona will face #16 Oklahoma State in the Alamo Bowl, and Washington will face #17 Nebraska in the Holiday Bowl.
 December 6 – Two of the four finalists for the Heisman Trophy represent the Pac-10: Oregon running back LaMichael James and Stanford quarterback Andrew Luck. This is the second year in a row that Stanford has had a Heisman Trophy finalist. Oregon head coach Chip Kelly is named the Eddie Robinson Coach of the Year by the Football Writers Association of America.
 December 9 – Oregon running back LaMichael James is the recipient of the Doak Walker Award, the second year in a row that a Pac-10 running back has received the award.
 December 11 – Stanford quarterback Andrew Luck is the runner-up in Heisman Trophy balloting to Auburn quarterback Cameron Newton, the second year in a row that a Stanford player is the runner-up in balloting for the Heisman.
 December 21 – Oregon head coach Chip Kelly is named the Associated Press College Football Coach of the Year. Stanford's Jim Harbaugh finished third in balloting.

Notes 
 USC is ineligible for the postseason due to sanctions imposed by the NCAA
 USC kicked off the Pac-10 football season by visiting Hawai'i on Thursday, September 2, 2010.
 The Pac-10 football season ends with games on Saturday, December 4, 2010
 January 6, 2011 – Fox signed a contract to air the first Pac-12 Conference football championship game on December 3, 2011 for $14.5 million.

Statistics leaders

Players-of-the-week 
National
 September 13 – Cal linebacker Mike Mohamed was named Lott IMPACT Player of the Week.
 September 21 – UCLA linebacker Patrick Larimore, who had a career-high and team-high 11 tackles (10 solos), including three for loss, forced a fumble and broke up a pass in the upset of No. 23 Houston on September 18 was named the FWAA/Bronko Nagurski National Defensive Player of the Week.
 September 27 – UCLA linebacker Akeem Ayers was named Lott IMPACT Player of the Week. The UCLA Bruins (2–2) are the Tostitos Fiesta Bowl National Team of the Week for games of the weekend of September 25.

Pacific-10 Conference

Pac-10 vs. BCS matchups

Bowl games 
All bowl games involving the Pac-10 aired on ESPN.

Head coaches 

 Mike Stoops, Arizona
 Dennis Erickson, Arizona State
 Jeff Tedford, California
 Chip Kelly, Oregon
 Mike Riley, Oregon State

 Jim Harbaugh, Stanford
 Rick Neuheisel, UCLA
 Lane Kiffin, USC
 Steve Sarkisian, Washington
 Paul Wulff, Washington State

Awards and honors 
Eddie Robinson Coach of the Year and Associated Press College Football Coach of the Year
 Chip Kelly, Oregon

Woody Hayes Trophy
 Jim Harbaugh, Stanford

Doak Walker Award
 LaMichael James, RB, Oregon

Paul Hornung Award
 Owen Marecic, FB and LB, Stanford.

National Finalists
 Akeem Ayers, LB, UCLA, Butkus Award (most outstanding defensive player)
 LaMichael James, RB, Oregon, Heisman Trophy (most outstanding player) and Doak Walker Award (most outstanding running back)
 Andrew Luck, QB, Stanford, Heisman Trophy, Maxwell Award (best player), and Davey O'Brien Award (best quarterback)
 Owen Marecic, FB/LB, Stanford, William V. Campbell Trophy (top scholar-athlete)
 Mike Mohamed, LB, California, William V. Campbell Trophy

All-Americans 

Walter Camp Football Foundation All-America:
 Running back LaMichael James, Oregon, first team All-America
 Quarterback Andrew Luck, Stanford, second team All-America
 Center Chase Beeler, Stanford, second team All-America
 Linebacker Akeem Ayers, UCLA, second-team All-America
 Defensive back Cliff Harris, Oregon, second-team All-America
 Kick returner Cliff Harris, Oregon, second-team All-America

Associated Press All-America First Team:
 RB LaMichael James, Oregon
 OL Chase Beeler, Stanford
 DT Stephen Paea, Oregon State

FWAA All-America Team:

Sporting News All-America team:
 RB LaMichael James, Soph., Oregon, Offense first-team
 OL Chase Beeler, Sr., Stanford, Offense first-team
 DT Stephen Paea, Sr., Oregon State, Defense first-team
 LB Vontaze Burfict, Soph., Arizona State, Defense first-team
 S Rahim Moore, Jr., UCLA, Defense first-team
 PR Cliff Harris, Soph., Oregon, Defense first-team

AFCA Coaches' All-Americans First Team:

ESPN All-America team:

All-Pac-10 teams 
 Offensive Player of the Year: Andrew Luck, QB, Stanford
 Pat Tillman Defensive Player of the Year: Stephen Paea, DT, Oregon State
 Offensive Freshman of the Year: Robert Woods, WR, USC
 Defensive Freshman of the Year: Junior Onyeali, DE, Arizona State
 Coach of the Year: Chip Kelly, Oregon

First Team:

ST=special teams player (not a kicker or returner)

All-Academic 
First Team:

2011 NFL Draft

References